Keoke Cotner (born July 11, 1971) is an American professional golfer who played on the Nationwide Tour. 

Cotner joined the Nationwide Tour in 2000. In his rookie year on Tour he recorded three top-10 finishes and won the Buy.com Oregon Classic. The following year he also recorded three top-10 finishes while finishing in a tie for second twice. In 2002 he recorded his career best finish on the money list, 25th, while recording four top-10 finishes including a tied for second. From 2003 to 2009 he recorded nine top-10 finishes including a runner up finish in 2004, 2005 and 2008.

His brother, Kawika, is also a professional golfer and has played on the PGA Tour and the Nationwide Tour.

Professional wins (1)

Buy.com Tour wins (1)

External links

American male golfers
North Texas Mean Green men's golfers
PGA Tour golfers
Golfers from Texas
Sportspeople from Veracruz
People from Bedford, Texas
1971 births
Living people